Sea to Sea: For Endless Days is the third album in the Sea to Sea Christian praise and worship music series.  The album has thirty songs and two bonus tracks performed by various Canadian artists on two CDs.  It won a Gospel Music Association Canada Covenant Award in 2007 for Special Events/Compilation Album of the Year.  The song "For Endless Days", written for this album, garnered a 2007 Covenant Award nomination for Praise And Worship Song Of The Year.

Track listing

Disc 1 

"Show Us Your Glory" - Jody Cross
"Son Of God" - Starfield
"Above Every Name" - Riley Armstrong
"Your Amazing Grace" (Sea To Sea Mix) - Jon Bauer
"Glimpse Of You" - Tara Dettman
"I've Found Love" - Adam Farrell
"More Than Amazing" - Jachin Mullen
"Summer Rain" - Andréanne Lafleur
"Like Rain" - Thursday Waiting
"Lift Voice: Lift Soul" - Corey Doak
"Let It Be" - Dave Hensman
"When You Shepherd Me" - Brian Doerksen
"All I'm Living For" - Matt Tapley
"Perfect Picture" - Lamont Hiebert
"Come, Now Is The Time To Worship" - Hiram Joseph
"My Jesus I Love Thee" - Sean and Aimee Dayton

Disc 2 

"For Endless Days" - Various (Songwriters: Glen Teeple, Martin Smith and Jeff Teed)
"God Is Our Hope" - Toronto Mass Choir
"Mystery" - Elevate / Briercrest College
"Great Is Your Name" - Sebastian Demrey
"Glory" - Cindy Morgan
"Who Will Open" - David Johnston
"Song Of Praise" - Paul Turner
"Speak To Me" - Encounter
"Majesty" - Victory Christian Centre
"Hakuna" - Krystaal
"Freedom Reigns" - Michael Larson
"Poetry In Motion" - Jeff Somers Band
"Holy Place" - Meghan Pierce
"My Troubled Soul" - Robert Critchley
"Amazed" - Kelly Draper
"Pluie D'été" - Andréanne Lafleur

References 

Contemporary Christian music albums by Canadian artists
2006 compilation albums